Daniel, Danny or Dan Evans may refer to:

Arts and entertainment
 Daniel Evans (Welsh poet) (Daniel Ddu o Geredigion, 1792–1846), Welsh poet
 Daniel Evans (singer) (born 1969), The X Factor 2008 finalist
 Daniel Evans (actor) (born 1973), Welsh actor
 Dan Evans, character in the film 3:10 to Yuma

Sport
 Dan Evans (baseball) (born 1960), American baseball executive
 Danny Evans (cricketer) (born 1987), Middlesex cricketer
 Daniel Evans (rugby player) (born 1988), Welsh rugby union player
 Danny Evans (rugby league), English rugby league footballer, and coach
 Dan Evans (tennis) (born 1990), English tennis player

Others
 Daniel Silvan Evans (1818–1903), Welsh scholar and lexicographer
 Daniel J. Evans (born 1925), Governor of Washington and United States Senator
 Daniel Evans (minister) (1774–1835), Welsh independent Christian minister
 Daniel Evans (bishop) (1900–1962), Anglican bishop in South America

See also
 Danielle Evans (disambiguation)